Björköby is a village and a former municipality now part of Korsholm, Finland. It is the chief settlement on the island of Björkö. The harbour of the village is called Svedjehamn.

Björköby was an independent municipality until 1973.

History 
Björköby was first mentioned in 1543 as Börckön. It was a part of the Mussar (later Korsholm) parish until 1872, when Replot was separated from it, though Replot had already become a municipality in 1868. The local name for the settlement is simply Björkö, "birch island", but it was changed to Björköby (by meaning "village") in 1932, when it became its own municipality. This was done to distinguish it from other Björkös, since Björkö is a fairly common place name. Björköby never formed a separate parish.

Together with Replot, Kvevlax and Solf, Björköby was consolidated with Korsholm in 1973.

References

Korsholm
Former municipalities of Finland
Villages in Finland